Guo Guirong (born 25 October 1937) is a lieutenant general (zhongjiang) of the People's Liberation Army (PLA) who served as president of National University of Defense Technology from 1994 to 1996. He is an academician of the Chinese Academy of Engineering. He was a delegate to the 8th and 10th National People's Congress. He was a representative of the 17th National Congress of the Chinese Communist Party.

Biography
Guo was born in Chengdu, Sichuan, on 25 October 1937, while his ancestral home in Xuqing County, Shanxi. After graduating from PLA Communication Engineering College (now Xidian University) in 1959, he was accepted to Harbin Institute of Military Engineering. In 1960, he was sent to study at Zhukovsky Air Force Engineering Academy on the expense of the government, earning a vice-doctorate degree in 1965.

He returned to China in 1965 and that year became professor at Harbin Institute of Military Engineering. In February 1994, he was appointed president of National University of Defense Technology, a position he held until July 1996.

Honours and awards 
 1993 State Science and Technology Progress Award (Second Class) for KD85-466 system
 1995 Member of the Chinese Academy of Engineering (CAE)
 1999 State Science and Technology Progress Award (Second Class)
 2006 Science and Technology Progress Award of the Ho Leung Ho Lee Foundation
 2007 State Science and Technology Progress Award (Second Class)
 2008 State Science and Technology Progress Award (Second Class)

References 

1937 births
Living people
People from Chengdu
Presidents of the National University of Defense Technology
Members of the Chinese Academy of Engineering
People's Liberation Army generals from Sichuan
People's Republic of China politicians from Sichuan
Chinese Communist Party politicians from Sichuan
Delegates to the 8th National People's Congress
Delegates to the 10th National People's Congress